The steppe wolf (Canis lupus campestris), also known as the Caspian Sea wolf, is a subspecies of grey wolf native to the Caspian steppes, the steppe regions of the Caucasus, the lower Volga region, southern Kazakhstan north to the middle of the Emba, and the steppe regions of the lower European part of the former Soviet Union. It may also occur in northern Afghanistan and Iran and occasionally the steppe regions of Romania and Hungary. Studies have shown that this type of wolf is  known to carry rabies. Due to its close proximity to domestic animals, the need for a reliable vaccination is high. 

Rueness et al. (2014) showed that wolves in the Caucasus Mountains of the putative Caucasian subspecies, C. l. cubanensis, are not genetically distinct enough to be considered a subspecies, but may represent a local ecomorph of C. l. lupus. In Kazakhstan, villagers keep them as guard animals.

Appearance 
It is of average dimensions, weighing 35–40 kg (77–88 lb), thus being somewhat smaller than the Eurasian wolf, and its fur is sparser, coarser, and shorter. The flanks are light grey, and the back is rusty grey or brownish with a strong admixture of black hairs. The guard hairs on the withers usually do not exceed 70–75 mm. The fur of steppe wolves in Middle Asia and Kazakhstan tends to have more reddish tones. The tail is poorly furred. The skull is 224–272 mm long and 128–152 mm wide.

Steppe wolves occasionally surplus kill Caspian seals.

References

Mammals described in 1804
Subspecies of Canis lupus
Mammals of Central Asia
Mammals of Russia